Rosendo Huesca Pacheco (3 March 1932 – 25 November 2017) was a Mexican Catholic prelate.

Born in 1932, he was ordained a priest in 1956. In 1970, he was consecrated bishop. He became archbishop of Puebla de los Ángeles in 1977 and served until his retirement in 2009. Huesca Pacheco died at the age of 85 on 25 November 2017.

References

External links and additional sources
 (for Chronology of Bishops)
 (for Chronology of Bishops)

1932 births
2017 deaths
21st-century Roman Catholic archbishops in Mexico
20th-century Roman Catholic archbishops in Mexico
People from Puebla